Stoyan Petrov (31 March 1956) is a Bulgarian former cyclist. He competed in the 1000m time trial event at the 1980 Summer Olympics.

References

External links
 

1956 births
Living people
Bulgarian male cyclists
Olympic cyclists of Bulgaria
Cyclists at the 1980 Summer Olympics
Place of birth missing (living people)